Río Bravo Airport is an airstrip  southeast of Caleta Tortel in the Aysén Region of Chile. The airstrip serves settlements along the Estero Mitchell, one of the many channels leading to the Pacific Ocean.

There is mountainous terrain in all quadrants.

See also

Transport in Chile
List of airports in Chile

References

External links
OpenStreetMap - Río Bravo Airport
OurAirports - Río Bravo Airport
SkyVector - Río Bravo Airport

Airports in Chile
Airports in Aysén Region